Karl Albert Joseph Peters (23 January 1904 – 2 July 1998) was a German expert in criminal law, criminal pedagogy and miscarriages of justice. He studied legal science in Königsberg, Leipzig and Münster.

Peters was awarded the Federal Cross of Merit and the Order of St. Sylvester.

Publications
Peters, K. Strafprozess: ein Lehrbuch. Heidelberg: Müller, 1985. 
Peters, K. Justiz als Schicksal: ein Plädoyer für ‚die andere Seite‘. Berlin: De Gruyter, 1979. 
Klaus Wasserburg (org.) et al.: Wahrheit und Gerechtigkeit im Strafverfahren: Festgabe für Karl Peters aus Anlass seines 80. Geburtstages, Heidelberg: Müller, 1984. 
Jürgen Baumann, Klaus Tiedemann (editors). Einheit und Vielfalt des Strafrechts: Festschrift für Karl Peters zum 70. Geburtstag. Tübingen: Mohr, 1974.

References

External links

1904 births
1998 deaths
Leipzig University alumni
University of Königsberg alumni
Academic staff of the University of Münster
Academic staff of the University of Tübingen
German scholars
Commanders Crosses of the Order of Merit of the Federal Republic of Germany